The 12049 / 12050 Gatimaan Express is India's first semi-high speed train that runs between Delhi and Jhansi.

The top operating speed of the Gatimaan Express is up to 160 km/h between Tughlakabad railway station to Bilochpura , which makes it the fastest regularly scheduled train service in India. Trial runs of other trains have been faster, and if the rail infrastructure on Vande Bharat Express routes were to be improved, it could also go as fast as the Gatiman Express.

History
In October 2014, the railways applied for safety certificate from Commission of Railway Safety to start the service. In June 2015, the train was officially announced. The train was launched on 5 April 2016 and completed its maiden journey between Nizamuddin and Agra Cantt within 100 minutes. But due to low occupancy, Indian Railways first extended this train from Agra to Gwalior on 19 February 2018 and then to Virangana Lakshmibai junction on 1 April 2018.

Loco link
The Gatimaan Express is regularly hauled by a WAP 5 electric locomotive from the Ghaziabad Loco Shed. WAP-5 locomotives 30007, 30140, 35020, 35008, 35007 & 30120 from the Ghaziabad (GZB) Electric locomotive Shed are used to haul this train in both directions. These locomotives are equipped with TPWS (Train Protection and Warning System).

Coach Composition 
The 12050/12049 Gatimaan Express currently has 8 AC Chair Car and 2 Executive Chair Car coaches. The coaches in Light Blue indicates AC Chair Car and the coaches in Pink indicate AC Executive Chair Cars

Schedule 
The schedule of this 12050/12049 Hazrat Nizamuddin - Jhansi Jn Gatimaan Express is given below:-

Speed
The maximum permissible speed is 160 kmph but not for the whole journey. The maximum permissible speed is 120 kmph between H. Nizamuddin and Tughlakabad. Railway is trying to increase the maximum permissible speed of H. Nizamuddin - Tughlakabad route up to 130 kmph from 120 kmph and for this reason, maximum permissible speed of this train will be increased to 130 kmph between H. Nizamuddin and Tughlakabad. The maximum permissible speed is 160 kmph between Tughlakabad and Agra Cant and speed of this part makes it the train having highest speed in the country, the maximum permissible speed is 130 kmph between Agra Cant and Virangna Lakshmibai. Railway is planning to increase its speed to 160 kmph beyond Agra Cant.

See also

References 

Express trains in India
Rail transport in Uttar Pradesh
Rail transport in Delhi
Railway services introduced in 2016
Transport in Delhi
Named passenger trains of India